The Hybrid may refer to:

 Hybrid (DC Comics), a fictional group of supervillains appearing in DC Comics
 The Hybrid (album), an album by Danny Brown
 "The Hybrid" (The Vampire Diaries), an episode of the television series The Vampire Diaries
 The Hybrid (film), 2014 (original title "Scintilla")

See also
Hybrid (disambiguation)